Lommi is a surname. Notable people with the surname include:

Oiva Lommi (1922–2000), Finnish rower
Veikko Lommi (1917–1989), Finnish rower

Finnish-language surnames